Fouzi Lekjaa (Arabic: فوزي لقجع; born on 23 July 1970) is a Moroccan football administrator and businessman, who is the president of the Royal Moroccan Football Federation since 2014, and a member of the FIFA Council since 2021. On 7 October 2021 he was appointed Minister Delegate to the Minister of Finance, responsible for the budget.

Biography

Fouzi Lekjaa was born in Berkane on 23 July 1970, to a middle-class family. He spent his childhood in this city where he obtained his baccalaureate before starting higher studies in Rabat. His father is a former Arabic teacher who started his career in Berkane.

As he specialized in sports and a graduate in agricultural engineering from the National School of Administration, Lekjaa began his career as a financial inspector. He was appointed head of the agricultural sector and compensation division at the budget department of the finance ministry in 2000. In the same year, he took on a role in the technical staff of the RS Berkane team, an amateur club playing in the Moroccan third division. He takes part in the club's infrastructure projects and gradually builds governance, organization and professionalization of the club with the help of his financial resources.

Its improvement work allows the validation of several lawns in the Berkane region as well as the development of several amateur clubs in the best conditions. Lekjaa gained notoriety in 2009 when he became the manager of his hometown club, the Berkane Sports Renaissance. It sets up a training center based in the same city for young talents evolving in the city, but also elsewhere in Morocco.

Entry into the management of RS Berkane

In 2009, Lekjaa was appointed president of the Berkane Sports Renaissance Club.

Having created financial stability within the club, several sponsors come forward. In two seasons, he managed to get his club up to Botola Pro, from which the club had been absent since 1984. RS Berkane knew in such a short time a huge margin of financial and sporting progress.

Lekjaa quickly created a bond of friendship with Ilyas El Omari, club president at Chabab Rif Al Hoceima, who also has the same background as him.

Presidency of the FRMF

Lekjaa has been the president of the Royal Moroccan Football Federation (FRMF) since 13 April 2014, when he succeeded Ali Fassi Fihri. Under his leadership, he quickly established a structure within the federation by developing 16 clubs in Moroccan D1 and 16 clubs in D2. The amateur class has a hundred clubs organized in regional league. At the level of each league, there are on average 120 clubs. The president obliges each club, of all levels, to have at least three classes of young people: the U17s, the U20s and the hopes. It modernizes and professionalizes infrastructure developments across the country.

Lekjaa is also building political will with King Mohammed VI, where the two men invest together in football projects.

In a record time of five years, they managed to launch the construction of the Mohammed VI complex in Salé. The complex is spread over 30 hectares and houses a capacity of 480 young footballers. It has nine training rooms, a covered room, a medical clinic that covers 400 square meters. This project cost $65,000,000. It was inaugurated in 2019.

On 25 June 2022, was reelected president of the Royal Moroccan Football Federation (FRMF), during the elective general assembly of the Federation, held Friday at the Mohammed VI complex in Maamora. Lekjaa submitted his candidacy for the position on June 4, and was the only candidate, running for his third term in the same position.

Member of the CAF Council 
In July 2017, he had been the 2nd vice-president of the Confederation of African Football (CAF). On 2 April 2021, Lekjaa was Reappointed as Chairman of CAF Finance Committee. 

On 13 March 2023, Algeria’s state media accused Lekjaa of “corruption” and “manipulation”, this led to a campaign across social media platforms demanding Lekjaa exit from the CAF Committee.

Member of the FIFA Council 
In March 2021, he was elected to the FIFA Council.

Member of the Union of Arab Football Associations 
On 17 June 2021, Lekjaa was Elected Member of Executive Council of Arab Football Associations Union.

2022 FIFA World Cup 
On 28 December 2022, Lekjaa launched an investigation into the potentially illegal sale of 2022 FIFA World Cup tickets. On 8 March, Lekjaa confirmed the investigation is near to end, claiminig the results will be out “very soon,” revealing the federation’s determination to “end the career” of those responsible for the tickets fiasco.

Honours 
Ydnekatchew Tessema Trophy for the Federation President of the Year: 2018

Orders 
Order of the Throne: 2022

References

1970 births
Living people
Association football executives
People from Berkane
Moroccan football chairmen and investors